The 1958 NCAA College Division Cross Country Championships were contested at the first annual NCAA-sanctioned cross country meet to determine the team and individual national champions of men's collegiate cross country running among small colleges in the United States.

This was the first NCAA championship held exclusively for College Division (future Divisions II and III) teams; all university teams remained part of the NCAA University Division Cross Country Championship (later re-designated as Division I). 

Held on November 15, 1958, the meet was hosted by Wheaton College at the Chicago Country Club in Wheaton, Illinois. The distance for the race was 4 miles (6.4 kilometers). 

The team national championship was won by Northern Illinois, the Huskies' first. The individual championship was won by Paul Whiteley, from Kansas State Teachers, with a time of 20:45.

Qualification
Following the creation of the NCAA"s multi-division structure this year, only NCAA College Division teams, and their respective runners, were eligible. In total, 20 teams and 114 individual runners contested this championship.

Results
Distance: 4 miles (6.4 kilometers)

Team Result

See also
NCAA University Division Cross Country Championship

References
 

NCAA Cross Country Championships
NCAA University Division Cross Country Championships
NCAA University Division Cross Country Championships
NCAA University Division Cross Country Championships
Wheaton, Illinois